Luke Jermay (born 7 March 1985 in Basildon, Essex, England) is an English magician, mentalist, and writer.

Early life
Jermay (born Jermey) was born to a single mother, Jacqueline Jermey on 7 March 1985 in Essex, England.  Jermay studied magic and magic theory, has written many books on his art and has performed magic since the age of 12.  At age 15, he wrote his first published book 7 Deceptions, which reached international popularity within the magic community.

Magic career
He has performed in more than 20 countries including his native United Kingdom and the United States in venues from local taverns to the London Palladium on 20 December 2002 at the annual International Magic Convention in London, England.  Best known for his use of suggestion and the use and apparent use of covert forms of psychological influence, his trademark routines are an apparently self-induced cessation of his pulse, followed by an apparent stop of a random audience member's pulse, and The Chair Prediction, a routine in which Jermay predicts which chair a spectator will choose to sit in.

Jermay has written a total of 33 books and manuscripts on magic and magic theory, many of which are limited-release, but 4 of which have been published by magic companies and mass-circulated.  Those are 7 Deceptions, Building Blocks, Coral Fang, and 3510.

He has also worked with many other magicians and mentalists as writer, designer of psychological illusions and program consultant.  His first consulting work was on season 1 of Derren Brown, Mind Control (2000) consulting for Derren Brown which he continued on seasons 2&3 of Derren Brown, Trick of the Mind (2003–2004).  Jermay also worked with Criss Angel on seasons 1&2 of Mind Freak (2005–2006), and with Marco Tempest on The Virtual Magician (2004).

Jermay, along with Marcus Monroe and Ben Seidman was a founding member of The Optical Delusions, a 2008 touring show that billed itself as "an evening of new-school variety."

He also served as consultant for the television series The Mentalist which started in 2008.

More recently he has consulted for Dynamo, a UK based magician from Bradford.

Published works

Books

Guest contributions

	Miracles of Suggestion by Kenton Knepper (three effects)
	The Theta Portfolio by Allen Zingg (one effect)
	The Garden of The Strange by Caleb Strange (several additions)
	Meant To Be by John Born (collaboration between Jermay and Banachek)
       Goats Grimoire by jose prager (collaboration between Jermay and Peter Turner)

Feature magazine articles

 The Centre Tear Magazine;  A series of 6 essays/effects published in the online Magazine "The Centre Tear."
 MAGIC Magazine; A trick-teaching section devoted to Jermay's effects.  Most published in other sources.
 Genii Magazine; An ongoing series of essays and effects, and a cover article.
 MagicSeen: Cover article and interview.

DVDs

	Skullduggery
	Induction (not yet published)
	International Magic Live Lecture.
	Mind Magic Performance DVD (after show sales only)
       Emotional Intelligence
       An Extraordinary Exhibition of Seeing with the Fingertips
       Colorblind
       Making Mind Reading Look Real

Podcasts

	The performers podcast.  www.penguinmagic.com
	Radio Magic Interviews. www.radiomagic.com

Special Interview/Guest Weeks on Magic Forums

	The magic woods.  www.magicwoods.com
	Talk Magic.  www.talkmagic.co.uk
	Magic Bunny.  www.magicbunny.co.uk
	Magic Tricks UK. www.magictricks.co.uk

TV Shows

	Derren Brown (Trick of the Mind Season 3 Writer.)
	Criss Angel (Mind Freak seasons 1, 2. Writer/director and talking head features.)
	Marco Tempest (The Virtual Magician Live Show Writer.)
	The Johnny Vaune Show (resident mind reader performance)
	The History of Magic (The world's best mind readers. Performance and writer credit)
       Dynamo magician impossible (series 1&2) (series 2 in the making currently 2 April 2012)

References

Further reading
  
  
  
  
  
 

Jermay,Luke
1985 births
Living people
People from Basildon
Mentalists
Magic consultants